The Portage Area Regional Transportation Authority, commonly referred to as PARTA, is a transit agency serving Portage County, Ohio. It is headquartered in Franklin Township just outside the Kent city limits. PARTA was formed in 1975 from an agreement between the city of Kent and Franklin Township and has since expanded to include routes over much of Portage County. It operates several local routes including circulator and suburban routes in Kent, and an interurban route connecting Ravenna, Kent, and Stow. PARTA also offers express routes including services into downtown Cleveland, Akron as well as weekday service to the rural Portage County communities of Windham, Garrettsville and Hiram. In addition, PARTA includes Kent State University's Campus Bus Service, which it acquired in 2004, and a dial-a-ride service. A proposed plan to acquire Lorain County Transit to serve better bus service in Lorain County.

PARTA operates a fleet of Orion VII, ENC Axess, and  Gillig Advantage low-floor buses. Many of the Advantages, though not all, were acquired second-hand from Canton, Ohio's SARTA and most have had their fare-boxes removed. Due to the lack of fare-boxes, some of the Advantages are restricted to the Kent State Campus Bus Service, though the others retaining their boxes also make appearances on routes 35 and 40. The Orions and Axesses are used for all other routes in addition to the Campus Bus Services.

PARTA also operates the Kent Central Gateway. Finished in July 2013, it is the only parking garage in downtown Kent. This garage houses the city's downtown transit facility (off-campus), along with storefronts and offices for rent.

County service 
 30 Interurban West (Stow)
 35 Interurban East (Ravenna)
 40 (North) 45 (South) Suburban
 46 Downtowner (Trolley) (Thurs, Fri & Sat after 4pm)
 70 Windham/Garretsville
 80 Raven (Cleveland Rd)
 85 Raven (Prospect)

Campus service 
 51 Campus Loop (Weekdays) 
 53 Reverse Loop (Weekdays 8-6) SUSPENDED 
 55 Allerton via Sports Complex (Weekdays) 
 57 Stadium Loop (breaks and Saturdays)
 58 Summit East/Front Campus (Weekdays)
 59 Stadium Night Loop (Mon-Thur 10p-3a Sun 4p-3a)
 90 Akron Express (Weekdays)
 100 Cleveland Express (Weekdays)

All buses in the route 50 series (i.e. 51, 53) are fare-free to the public. The Cleveland Express is $5.00 each way and The Akron Express is $1.00 each way. No passes accepted in either of these routes.

Connecting services
PARTA provides connecting services with three neighboring transit authorities, the Greater Cleveland Regional Transit Authority and the METRO Regional Transit Authority in Summit County. In addition, connections are possible to Greyhound, the Barons Bus Lines College Connection, the Stark Area Regional Transportation Authority (SARTA) by way of METRO's Pfaff Transit Center in Akron.

References

External links
Official website

Bus transportation in Ohio
Kent, Ohio
Transportation in Portage County, Ohio
Transportation in Akron, Ohio
Transit agencies in Ohio
1975 establishments in Ohio